Saphrys tehuelche is a species of jumping spider (family Salticidae). The species was classified in the genus Euophrys from 1968, when it was first described by María Elena Galiano, until 2015. It can be found in Chile.

References

Salticidae
Arthropods of Chile
Endemic fauna of Chile